FC Samgurali Tsqaltubo is a Georgian association football club from Tsqaltubo, which takes part in Erovnuli Liga, the first tier of the national league. 

They have been runners-up of the Georgian Cup three times.

History

In Soviet and national leagues

Formed in 1945 as FC Medic, the football club from Tsqaltubo had the most prolific years in 1980s. Between 1983 and 1990 under the name Shadrevani they  became champions of the Georgian Soviet league three times, once finished as runners-up and once won bronze medals. 

When Georgian Football Federation formed an independent championship in 1990, Samgurali spent eight out of the initial ten seasons in the top flight. In 1999/2000, they finished in the drop zone and left the league. In this period the team experienced the worst decade in their history as they ceased to exist for four years.

Samgurali gained promotion to the second division in 2010 and stayed there as a stable member for nine successive seasons. The team finished as group runners-up in the 2016 transitional tournament, when the promotion rule was suspended. Two years later they slipped into the relegation zone after the last round. Worse was yet to come, as Samgurali suffered a play-off defeat on away goals. 

Despite this setback, following the club's purchase by new owners in the summer of 2019, ambitious promotion plans were unveiled. It took Samgurali a year to climb back to Liga 2. The team came 2nd in the regular season and secured a convincing victory in both play-off ties. The next season brought another triumph. The club prevailed over their opponents again in both games and returned to the first tier after an eighteen-year break. This double promotion in two consecutive years was achieved under head coach Ucha Sosiashvili. 

Due to prolific performance in the league, striker Sergo Kukhianidze became the first Samgurali player who was called up to the national team for friendly games in June 2021.

Georgian Cup 
Apart from winning promotion to Erovnuli Liga, the team in 2020 also achieved an impressive success by reaching the final of David Kipiani Cup for the first time since 1999. As in the previous case though, they again lost the final game on penalty shoot-out. 

Nor the third attempt made the next year was fruitful. Having won four away games en route to the final, Samgurali were defeated in the regular time with a narrow margin.

Seasons

 

Key to league record:

P = Played

W = Games won

D = Games drawn

L = Games lost

F = Goals for

A = Goals against

Pts = Points

Pos = Final position

Key to divisions:
 PL = Pirveli Liga
 L2 = Erovnuli Liga 2
 L3 = Liga 3
 EL = Erovnuli Liga
 UL = Umaglesi Liga

Key to rounds:
 DNE = Did not enter
 R1 = Round 1
 R2 = Round 2
 R3 = Round 3
 R5 = Round 5
 QF = Quarterfinals
 RU = Runners-up

Honours
Georgian Soviet Championship
 Champion: 1983, 1985, 1989
Georgian Soviet Cup
 Champion: 1988, 1989
Georgian Cup:
 Runners-up: 1999, 2020, 2021
Erovnuli Liga 2
 Champion: 1996
 Silver Medal winner: 1997, 2004, 2020
 Bronze Medal winner: 2001

Top scorers
With 41 goals scored in the 1992/93 season Merab Megreladze has been the leading goalscorer not only in the history of Samgurali, but also in Georgian top football division since its creation in 1990.

Current squad 
As of 28 February 2023

Managers
 Gia Gigatadze (August 2016 - May 2018) 
 Besik Khachiperadze (May 2018 - January 2019)
 Mikheil Makhviladze (January - September 2019)
 Ucha Sosiashvili (September 2019 - April 2021)
 Samson Pruidze (April - December 2021) 
 Giorgi Mikadze (December 2021 - December 2022)
 Giorgi Chelidze (since January 2023)

Other teams 
The reserve team known as Samgurali-2, which has recently spent one season in the third division, won Regionuli Liga Group West in 2021 and advanced to Liga 4.

References

External links
 Official website
 On Soccerway

Samgurali Tsqaltubo
1945 establishments in Georgia (country)
Sports organizations established in 1945